Cingulina trisulcata is a species of sea snail, a marine gastropod mollusk in the family Pyramidellidae, the pyrams and their allies.

Distribution
This marine species occurs off Hong Kong.

References

 Yen, T.-C. (1942). A review of the Chinese gastropods in the British Museum. Proceedings of the Malacological Society of London. 24 (5/6): 170-290

External links
 To World Register of Marine Species

Pyramidellidae
Gastropods described in 1894